Quilty, historically Killty, is a small fishing village between Milltown Malbay and Doonbeg in County Clare, Ireland. Lobster, salmon, bass, herring and mackerel are landed at Quilty, formerly known for its curing industry.  The area was officially classified as part of the west Clare Gaeltacht, an Irish-speaking community, until 1956.

The Catholic Church, belonging to the parish Kilmurry Ibrickane, is the most prominent building, its round tower being visible for miles around the flat countryside. It was built in remembrance of the Leon XIII rescue.

Leon XIII 
On 2 October 1907 a French three-masted full-rigged ship, the Leon XIII, was driven up on some of the very rocky reefs on Quilty Bay. All seemed lost for the ship and crew. The local fishermen, however, went out to sea in their currachs – risking the equinoctial gales and Atlantic breakers in small open boats. They reached the wreck and somehow managed to save the crew and bring them safely ashore.

The church porch contains a replica of the Leon XIII in a glass bottle, and the ship's bell stands in front of the altar.

Mutton Island 

Across the bay from Quilty is Mutton Island. St Senan founded a church here in the early 6th century but by 1887 little remained except the Bed of St Senan, a shattered cross and a gable of his oratory. A signal tower built in the early 19th century was designed to give warning of invasion during the Napoleonic period but was also used by the coastguard to prevent smuggling. In the early 20th century Mutton Island was used as a prison; during certain tidal conditions, it is possible to walk along a path of limestone from Seafield (near Quilty) to Mutton Island.

Tromoroe Castle 
Tromoroe Castle lies about 3 km from the village. It witnessed a number of battles in the 16th century, the most notable when Teigh Caech McMahon with the help of the Earl of Desmond stormed the castle on 17 February 1599.  The next attack was by O'Flaherty from Connacht on 1 May 1642, when Peter Ward, his wife and heir were slain.

Sport 
In the 1970s Quilty GAA club amalgamated with Kilmurry Ibrickane GAA club. The club kept the name Kilmurry-Ibrickane GAA but started playing at the former club grounds in the village.

Notable people
 Patricia Morrissey - Camogie player

See also
 List of towns and villages in Ireland

References

External links
 Clare County Library - Quilty

Towns and villages in County Clare